National Route 20 is a national highway in South Korea connects Sancheong to Pohang. It was established on 14 March 1981.

Main stopovers

South Gyeongsang Province
 Sancheong County - Uiryeong County - Hapcheon County - Changnyeong County
North Gyeongsang Province
 Cheongdo County - Gyeongju - Pohang

Major intersections

 (■): Motorway
IS: Intersection, IC: Interchange

South Gyeongsang Province

North Gyeongsang Province

References

20
Roads in South Gyeongsang
Roads in North Gyeongsang